Tetraneuris ivesiana is a North American species of plants in the sunflower family, known by the common name Ives' fournerved daisy. It grows in the southwestern United States, in Arizona, New Mexico, Utah, Colorado.

It forms a branching underground caudex sometimes producing as many as 30 above-ground stems. One plant can produce as many as 30 flower heads. Each head has 7-10 yellow ray flowers surrounding 40-150 yellow disc flowers.

References

ivesiana
Flora of the Southwestern United States
Endemic flora of the United States
Plants described in 1898